The Early Renaissance French  Château de Vallery, in Vallery, in the département of Yonne in the Burgundy region of France, was built in 1548 for Jacques d'Albon de Saint-André, marquis de Fronsac, a court favorite of Henri II and maréchal de France. It was never completed, and what remains of it has been mutilated. The site he chose was the ancient château-fort of Vallery, dating in part to the early thirteenth century; he purchased it 16 April 1548. Traces of walls and fortified towers remain at the site. The architect was the king's architect, Pierre Lescot, who also built the hôtel particulier of the Maréchal in Paris (demolished). Vallery's facades, today of brick with stone quoins and details, were originally covered with red and black marble.

Works at Vallery were interrupted by the king's death (1559), followed by that of the Maréchal (1562). Two years later his widow passed Vallery to Louis I de Bourbon, prince de Condé, who decorated the ceilings of the south wing: Francesco Primaticcio provided some of the internal decoration in the manner of his School of Fontainebleau. Engravings of Vallery and its parterre gardens at this time appeared in Jacques Androuet du Cerceau's Les plus excellents bastiments de France.

In the church is the grand marble tomb of Henry II de Bourbon, prince de Condé (1588–1646), designed by the illustrious sculptor Gilles Guérin. After 1682 (when drawings by Sengre, now at the Musée Condé in Chantilly, were made) the south wing, which was the main corps de logis was demolished, under Louise-Anne de Bourbon-Condé, Mlle de Sens (1695–1768), daughter of Louis III de Bourbon, prince de Condé, leaving the west wing, a grand gallery supported on an arcade, which was now closed in, and the southwest corner pavilion. In 1747 the heiress Elisabeth de Condé sold the château; it suffered further demolitions and alterations, and in the twentieth century it lay for some time abandoned. More recently its Grande Galerie has had its partitions removed and is restored to its original dimensions; the château is currently rented for wedding parties.

Gallery

Notes

Vallery
Châteaux with Renaissance gardens in France